Cancellopollia is a genus of sea snails, marine gastropod mollusks in the family Pisaniidae.

Species
Species within the genus Cancellopollia include:
 Cancellopollia gracilis Vermeij & Bouchet, 1998
 Cancellopollia insculpta (Sowerby III, 1900)
 Cancellopollia ustulata Vermeij & Bouchet, 1998

References

 Vermeij G.J. & Bouchet P. 1998. New Pisaniinae (Mollusca, Gastropoda, Buccinidae) from New Caledonia, with remarks on Cantharus and related genera. Zoosystema 20(3): 471-485

Pisaniidae
Gastropod genera